The 12th Tejano Music Awards were held in 1992. They recognized accomplishments by musicians from the previous year. The Tejano Music Awards is an annual awards ceremony recognizing Tejano music musicians.

Award winners

Vocalists of The Year 
Male Vocalist of The Year
Joe Lopez
Female Vocalist of The Year
Selena

Vocal Duo Of the Year 
Joe Lopez, Jimmy Gonzalez and Mazz

Albums of the Year 
Orchestra (Para Nuestra Gente by Mazz)
Conjunto (Shoot It by Emilio Navaira)
Traditional (Si Todas Fueran Como Tu by Roberto Pulido)

Songs of The Year 
Song of The Year
Que Me Lleven Canciones by Mazz
Single of The Year
Ven Devorame Otra Vez by Mazz
Tejano Country Song of The Year
She's Not Alone by David Lee Garza y Los Musicales

Entertainers of the Year 
Male Entertainer of The Year
Joe Lopez
Female Entertainer of The Year
Selena

Most Promising Band of The Year 
Joe Lopez

Song-writer of The Year 
David Lee Garza y Los Musicales

See also 
Tejano Music Awards

References 

Tejano Music Awards
Tejano Music Awards by year
Tejano Music Awards
Tejano Music Awards